The gens Amafinia or Amafania was a Roman family during the late Republic.  The best-known member of the gens was Gaius Amafinius, one of the earliest Roman writers in favor of the Epicurean philosophy.  Cicero considered his works deficient in arrangement and style.

See also
 List of Roman gentes

References

Roman gentes